The Ladies Literary Club Clubhouse, at 850 East South Temple St. in Salt Lake City, Utah, was built in 1913.  It was designed by architects Treganza & Ware in Prairie School style.

The club was founded in 1877 and is the oldest women's club in the United States west of the Mississippi River. It is the successor to the Blue Tea literary club founded in 1876 by Jennie Anderson Froiseth.

Its first president was Mrs. Eliza Kirtley Royle, whose 1875-built home is also NRHP-listed.

The Clubhouse was listed on the National Register of Historic Places in 1978.

In 2013, the 'Ladies' donated the building to the Utah Heritage Foundation, a non-profit whose mission is to preserve, protect and promote Utah's historic built environment. UHF accepted the stewardship with plans to renovate the property and use it as a community event center. 
The foundation ran the Ladies Literary Club for public use for two years before listing it for sale or lease last January, 2015  hosting hundreds of cultural, performing, and private events that exposed
several thousand new people to this architectural landmark.

On April 22, 2016,  that cultural legacy continued as the Utah Heritage Foundation sold the property to Photo Collective Studios, of Salt Lake City-a group of millennial visual artists and entrepreneurs. 
Terms of the sale were
not disclosed, but a Preservation Easement, was recorded to protect the
historic character of the building's unique interior and exterior.

Utah Heritage Foundation's Board of Trustees decided to seek a new steward for the building and it was
listed for lease or sale in January 2015. Several proposals for reusing the building were made but the
Board of Trustees is pleased that the proposal by Photo Collective Studios was the one that ultimately
succeeded. “Photo Collective Studios presented us with an inspiring story and have a passion for
preserving the arts and creativity of Salt Lake City,” stated Janis Bennion, Chair of the Board of Trustees.
“We believe their passion extends to the preservation of architecture and the stories that lay in these
places as well,” said Kirk Huffaker, Executive Director for Utah Heritage Foundation. “Given their
business focus and connection with the creative community, their stewardship of the Ladies’ Literary
Club presented a unique opportunity to foster an ongoing collaboration that allows the building to be
utilized and accessed by the public, and to continue the legacy and ideals of the Ladies’ Literary Club for
cultural enrichment.”

After renovations to the Ladies Literary Club, the directors pay tribute to its past by renaming the historic venue the "Clubhouse".

April-Oct 2016, ClubhouseSLC underwent minor and major renovations including refinishing original hardwood floors throughout.

References

External links
Ladies Literary Clubhouse at SAH Archipedia

Clubhouses on the National Register of Historic Places in Utah
Prairie School architecture in Utah
Buildings and structures completed in 1913
Buildings and structures in Salt Lake City
Women's club buildings
1913 establishments in Utah
National Register of Historic Places in Salt Lake City
Women in Utah